Clowne was a rural district in Derbyshire, England from 1894 to 1974.

It was created by the Local Government Act 1894 as that part of the Worksop rural sanitary district which was in Derbyshire (the rest becoming either Worksop Rural District or Kiveton Park Rural District).  It consisted of four civil parishes :

Barlborough
Clowne
Elmton
Whitwell

It was abolished in 1974 under the Local Government Act 1972, going on to form part of the new district of Bolsover.

References
http://www.visionofbritain.org.uk/unit_page.jsp?u_id=10086700

History of Derbyshire
Local government in Derbyshire
Districts of England created by the Local Government Act 1894
Districts of England abolished by the Local Government Act 1972
Rural districts of England
Bolsover District